Afghanistan competed at the 2017 World Aquatics Championships in Budapest, Hungary from 14 July to 30 July. This marked the first appearance for the nation at the World Aquatics Championships.

Swimming

Afghanistan has received a Universality invitation from FINA to send two male swimmers to the World Championships.

References

Nations at the 2017 World Aquatics Championships
Afghanistan at the World Aquatics Championships
2017 in Afghan sport